Mert is a Turkish given name meaning, "manful", "brave", "trustworthy", and/or "the one who tells the truth", from Persian mard which means man. It is very popular in Turkey. It is also a nickname.

Given name
 Mert Alas, British fashion photographer of Turkish origin
 Mert Aytuğ (born 1984), Turkish racing car driver and motorcycle racer
 Mert Erdoğan (born 1989), Turkish footballer
 Mert Girmalegesse (born 1987), Turkish long-distance athlete of Ethiopian origin
 Mert Günok (born 1989), Turkish international footballer
 Mert Korkmaz (born 1971), Turkish footballer
 Mert Lawwill (born 1940), American motorcycle racer
 Mert Mutlu (born 1974), Turkish cyclist and coach
 Mert Müldür (born 1999), Turkish international footballer
 Mert Öcal (born 1982), Turkish model
 Mert Shumpert (born 1979), Turkish basketball player of American origin
 Mert Somay (born 1986), Turkish footballer 
 Mert Yazıcıoğlu (born 1993), Turkish actor 
 Mert Yücel, Turkish electronic music producer

Nickname
 Mert Hackett (1859–1938), American baseball player
 Márcio Nobre (born 1980), Brazilian footballer
 Mert Smiley (born 1951), American politician

Turkish masculine given names
Lists of people by nickname